John Ash (fl. 1420–1439) was an English politician.

He was a Member (MP) of the Parliament of England for Totnes in 1420 and for Middlesex in 1433 and 1439.

References

Year of birth missing
Year of death missing
Members of the Parliament of England (pre-1707) for Totnes
English MPs 1420
English MPs 1433
English MPs 1439